The 1956 Buenos Aires Grand Prix was a Formula Libre race held on 5 February 1956 in Mendoza, Argentina. The race was won over a distance of 60 laps by Argentine driver Juan Manuel Fangio from the Scuderia Ferrari team in his Lancia-Ferrari D50.

Entry list

Race result

References

Buenos Aires
Buenos Aires Grand Prix
1956 in Argentine motorsport